Round Lake is a small lake in Saratoga County, New York that is located east of the village of Round Lake. Fish species present in the lake are northern pike, tiger muskie, largemouth bass, carp, pumpkinseed sunfish, and brown bullhead. There is a carry down access located on the west shore off US-9.

Round Lake is a "kettle lake", formed at the end of the Wisconsin glaciation by a large block of ice left behind as the glacier melted. Outflow from the Iromohawk River deposited large amounts of debris around the block. Over time the river's course changed and the block melted, leaving the depression that became Round Lake.

References

Lakes of New York (state)
Lakes of Saratoga County, New York
Kettle lakes in the United States